Tbilisskaya (until 1936 — Tiflisskaya) is a village in the Krasnodar Territory of the Russian Federation, the administrative center of the Tbilissky District. It is located in the central part of the Krasnodar Territory, on the right bank of the Kuban River, 100 km north-east of Krasnodar. The population is 24,446 human (2020).

References

Rural localities in Krasnodar Krai